Golden Nugget Hotels & Casinos is an American chain of luxury hotels and casinos. It currently operates five casino resorts in Nevada, Louisiana, New Jersey, and Mississippi.

The original location was the Golden Nugget Las Vegas which opened in 1946. The company runs as a division of Landry's Hospitality within the Fertitta Entertainment portfolio.

History

Original Golden Nugget
The Golden Nugget Las Vegas opened in 1946 in Downtown Las Vegas. Over time, notable members of the ownership group featured Jackie Gaughan and Steve Wynn. Wynn later became the majority stakeholder in 1973, making him the youngest casino owner in Las Vegas. Under Wynn, the casino brand expanded greatly. Once gaining the controlling sharehold, Wynn created Golden Nugget Companies Inc. The first hotel tower opened in 1977, which lead for the property to get awarded a four diamond rating from Mobil Travel Guide.

In 1980, the company opened the Golden Nugget Atlantic City (not to be confused with the current Golden Nugget Atlantic City) in New Jersey. The Las Vegas casino also expanded, with a second and third tower opened in 1984 and 1989, respectively, which included a showroom. The company's interest in Atlantic City did not last very long due to frustration with state gaming regulators, and in 1987, the property was sold to Bally's Entertainment, and eventually became Bally's Grand Hotel and Casino. In 1989, the company acquired the Nevada Club casino in Laughlin, Nevada, and re-branded it as the Golden Nugget Laughlin.

Mirage Resorts (1989-1999)

The company expanded into the Las Vegas Strip in 1989, with the opening of The Mirage. Following the completion, the company changed its name to Mirage Resorts. Financing the $630 million project largely with high-yield bonds issued by Michael Milken. The resort's high cost and emphasis on luxury meant that it was considered high risk at the time, though the project ended up being enormously lucrative. The hotel, with its erupting volcano and South Seas theme, ignited a $12 billion building boom on the Strip. Its construction is also considered noteworthy in that Wynn had set a new standard for Vegas resorts, and when it opened The Mirage was the first casino to use security cameras full-time on all table games. Known for its entertainment, the hotel became the exclusive venue for the Siegfried & Roy show in 1990, and in 1993 the hotel hosted the Cirque du Soleil show Nouvelle Expérience. Afterwards Wynn decided to invite Cirque to create Mystère for the soon-to-be-built Treasure Island resort next door. The company would later open other notable projects such as the Treasure Island Hotel and Casino and the Bellagio.

Acquisition by MGM Resorts

The company was acquired in 2000 by MGM Grand Inc., which then changed its name to MGM Mirage, for $6.4 billion, including $2 billion in assumed debt, after an initial all-cash offer of $17 per share and a final offer of $21 per share. The company was majority owned by Wynn. Although the Golden Nugget was profitable, it was not part of the master expansion plan of the corporation which was focused on consolidating a long stretch of the Strip, so MGM looked to sell the Golden Nugget.

Poster Financial Group

Timothy Poster and Thomas Breitling, two young (mid-30s) entrepreneurs, formed Poster Financial Group as a private investment firm. When the company was founded, its initial investors included travelscape.com, an internet travel site. Tennis star Andre Agassi, a Las Vegas native, was also an investor.

Poster and Breitling had no casino ownership experience before acquiring the Golden Nugget. They faced some difficulty in obtaining the necessary casino licenses because of their friendship with Rick Rizzolo, a strip club owner being investigated by the FBI and because of Poster's uncle who was denied a gaming license because of his alleged association with known illegal bookmakers. The Nevada Gaming Control Board recommended that they be licensed for only one year. The board however, issued them four-year licenses, with an option to apply for permanent licenses in January 2005.

The Poster Financial Group's ownership encountered some difficulties. The television series received ratings below expectations and was canceled after one season.  In addition, the strategy of attracting higher level casino players created significant volatility in the first year of operations.

Acquisition of the Golden Nugget casinos

In January 2004 the company acquired the Golden Nugget Las Vegas and the Golden Nugget Laughlin for approximately $215 million. When Poster and Breitling assumed control of the Golden Nugget, they began to upgrade the gambling operation, by installing new "cashless" slot machines and increasing the maximum bet at table games to $15,000. Their story became the basis for The Casino, a television series on Fox, which premiered on June 14, 2004.

On November 10, 2004 Barrick Gaming Corporation, which owns casino/hotels in downtown Las Vegas including The Plaza, The Vegas Club, The Western, and The Gold Spike, announced that it would acquire the Golden Nugget Laughlin for $31 million plus working capital. As part of the purchase agreement, Poster Financial granted Barrick a two-year limited use of the Golden Nugget brand name, after which Barrick will be required to change the name of the property.

Acquisition by Fertitta Entertainment

On February 4, 2005, Houston based Landry's Restaurants, Inc., now a subsidiary of Fertitta Entertainment, agreed to purchase the Golden Nugget Las Vegas for $140 million in cash plus the assumption of $155 million of debt.

On May 31, 2005 the agreement for Barrick Gaming to acquire the Golden Nugget Laughlin expired without a final deal being reached. As a result, Landry's acquired the property as part of its agreement to purchase the Golden Nugget Las Vegas. There was no increase in the purchase price as a result of this change since the money from the sale would have been used to reduce the debt on the Las Vegas property; instead, Landry's assumed that debt as well. On September 27, 2005 Landry's completed the acquisition of Poster Financial for approximately $318 million.

In 2022, Golden Nugget announced the acquisition of the Wildwood Casino and Hotel in Cripple Creek, Colorado, with plans to rebrand it under the Golden Nugget brand. The same year, the company broke ground on a casino in Danville, Illinois in a partnership deal with Wilmot Gaming.

Properties
 Golden Nugget Atlantic City

 Golden Nugget Biloxi

 Golden Nugget Danville, IL (Future)

 Golden Nugget Lake Charles

 Golden Nugget Las Vegas

 Golden Nugget Laughlin

 Golden Nugget Cripple Creek, CO (Future)

Other Ventures

Golden Nugget Online

The Golden Nugget first launched its online casino in New Jersey. It has since spun-off into its own publicly traded company with plans to expand. Golden Nugget's parent, Landry's, Inc., remains the largest stockholder of Golden Nugget Online.

Golden Nugget Club
The Toyota Center contains a Golden Nugget Club is a lounge and bar that bring the Golden Nugget theme to the arena.

References

External links
 Barrick Gaming Corporation press release on acquisition of Golden Nugget Laughlin
 Landry's Restaurants press release on acquisition of Golden Nugget Las Vegas (Acrobat Reader format)

Landry's Inc.
Gambling companies of the United States
Gambling companies established in 2004
Companies based in Las Vegas
Privately held companies based in the Las Vegas Valley